Octopus sasakii is a species of octopus found only in salt water. This species is a taxon inquirendum.

Physical description 
It is able to change its color. It moves forward by vigorously squeezing water in its cloak and pumping it through the siphon.

Diet 
It
is carnivorous with a diet consisting mainly of fish, crabs, lobsters
and molluscs, which it catches with the suction cups on its tentacles.

Parasitism 
It is parasitized by Dicyema shimantoense, which infects its renal appendages.

Name
The specific name honors the Japanese zoologist Madoka Sasaki who died in 1927.

References

External links
 ITIS Report: Octopus sasakii — the Island Sea of Japan.

Octopodidae
Molluscs of Japan
Molluscs of the Pacific Ocean
Marine molluscs of Asia
Molluscs described in 1942